The St. Nikolaus parish church (German: Pfarrkirche St. Nikolaus) is the parish church of Pfronten in the Ostallgäu district of Bavaria in Germany.

The ceiling fresco is the work of Josef Keller.

In popular culture
The exterior of the church appears in the movie The Great Escape.

References

Roman Catholic churches in Bavaria